The First Amendment of the Constitution of South Africa made changes related to the oath of office of the Acting President and to the jurisdiction of the Truth and Reconciliation Commission. It was enacted by the Parliament of South Africa, and signed by President Mandela on 28 August 1997. However it was deemed to come into effect retroactively, from 4 February 1997, the date when the constitution itself came into force.

Provisions 
The Act made three technical modifications to the Constitution:
 to provide that a person who serves as Acting President of the Republic more than once during a single presidential term only has to swear the oath of office the first time that they become Acting President.
 to allow the President of the Constitutional Court (now known as the Chief Justice) to designate another judge to administer the oath of office to the President or Acting President, rather than administering it personally.
 to extend the cut-off date for actions for which amnesty could be granted by the Truth and Reconciliation Commission, changing it from 6 December 1993 to 11 May 1994.
This last change allowed the TRC to deal with various violent events, particularly the Bophuthatswana coup d'état and its aftermath, that had occurred in the run-up to the 1994 general elections.

Formal title
The official short title of the amendment is "Constitution First Amendment Act of 1997". It was originally titled "Constitution of the Republic of South Africa Amendment Act, 1997" and numbered as Act No. 35 of 1997, but the Citation of Constitutional Laws Act, 2005 renamed it and abolished the practice of giving Act numbers to constitutional amendments.

External links

 Official text (PDF)

Amendments of the Constitution of South Africa
1997 in South African law